El Salvador and its OTI member station Telecorporación Salvadoreña (TCS) debuted in the OTI Festival in 1974 in Acapulco with many of their Central American neighbours. The first Salvadorean performer in the song contest was Félix Lopez with his song "Todo será de nosotros" (Everything will be ours), which placed 10th with three points in a tie with México, Honduras and the Netherlands Antilles. Since then, the country took part in every edition of the festival till the last edition which was held again in Acapulco.

History 
El Salvador was one of the least successful participants in the OTI Festival. In 1975 in San Juan, Puerto Rico, one year after their debut, the Central American country finished last with zero points in a tie with Bolivia. 

In Madrid in 1977 TCS achieved sixth place for El Salvador with Ana Marcela D'Antonio with her song "Enseñame a vivir" (Teach me how to live) which was acclaimed by the juries and the press. This was the first and only time when the Salvadorean delegation reached the top ten places in the contest.

Although El Salvador never managed to win the festival, it achieved a significant result with Álvaro Torres who took part in the festival in Santiago with his song "Gracias" (Thank you) in 1978. Even though he ended second to last, tied with Colombia, his career took off thanks to his performance in the OTI Festival.

Contestants 

OTI Festival
Salvadoran music